The Central District of Shazand County is a district (bakhsh) in Shazand County, Markazi Province, Iran. At the 2006 census, its population (including those portions later split off to form Qareh Kahrizi District) was 61,632, in 16,456 families; excluding those portion, its population was 36,592, in 9,829 families.  The District has two cities: Shazand and Astaneh. The District has two rural districts (dehestan): Astaneh Rural District and Kuhsar Rural District.

References 

Shazand County
Districts of Markazi Province